The Este  (Low Saxon: Eest) is a  left-bank tributary of the river Elbe that flows through Lower Saxony and Hamburg, Germany.

See also
List of rivers of Hamburg
List of rivers of Lower Saxony

References

Rivers of Hamburg
Rivers of Lower Saxony
Rivers of Germany